Wang Shixian (born 13 February 1990) is a retired Chinese professional badminton player. She is a former World No. 1 in women's singles.

Career 
Wang Shixian was admitted into Chinese Junior National Team in 2005 and was soon promoted to the second-level adult team a year later, but she got the chance to compete in the international stages only in 2009, after being promoted to the first-level adult team.

2007–2009 
Wang participated in 2007 BWF World Junior Championships being unseeded. She lost to Bae Yeon-ju there in straight games. In 2008, she won a silver medal in 2008 Asian Junior Badminton Championships, after losing to Li Xuerui, her compatriot. She also won a bronze medal in 2008 BWF World Junior Championships losing the semifinal to eventual winner Saina Nehwal.

In 2009, she stunned several seeded players in Malaysia Open Grand Prix Gold, including former world champion Zhu Lin in the second round, and reached the final. By beating her teammate Wang Xin there, she won her career's first-ever title. She won her first superseries title by winning 2009 China Masters Super Series in which she beat a series of strong rivals on her way, including no. 4 seed Wang Yihan in quarter-final, reigning world champion Lu Lan in semis, and no. 2 seeded Wang Lin in the final.

2010–2011 
Wang won 2 superseries titles this year, first one was 2010 Korea Open Super Series, where she beat Sung Ji-hyun in the final and another one was the 2010 Swiss Super Series event, by beating Jiang Yanjiao of China.

In the 2010 BWF World Championships, she defeated Saina Nehwal in the quarter-final and assured herself of the first ever major medal in her career. She settled for a bronze medal after losing the semifinal to Wang Xin with 19–21, 21–11, 16–21. She savoured her career's biggest ever success by winning the gold medal in the 2010 Asian games, beating her recent nemesis Wang Xin in the final with 21–18, 21–15 scores. She had runner-up finishes at the 2010 China Open Super Series & 2010 Hong Kong Super Series events also later in the year.

In 2011, Wang took part in the 2010 BWF Super Series Finals. In the group stage, she defeated Yao Jie, Salakjit Ponsana & Bae Yeon-ju in straight games. With her group victories, she advanced to the semifinal where she met Hong Kong's Yip Pui Yin and beat her in 2 games. Her opponent for the final was Bae Yeon-ju, whom Shixian defeated earlier in the group stage. This time too, Wang beat her, with 21–13, 21–15 scores and claimed the title victory which helped her to reach the World no. 1 position for the first time after ranks were updated next week. She then won the 2011 Malaysia Super Series after securing a stunning victory against Wang Yihan. Only after a week, she lost to same opponent Wang Yihan in the final of 2011 Korea Super Series. She claimed her first ever All England crown with her fascinating victory over Japan's Eriko Hirose in the final of 2011 All England Super Series with 24–22, 21–18 scoreline. She was seeded top in the 2011 BWF World Championships where she was upset by Taipei's shuttler Cheng Shao-chieh in quarter-final. She then claimed 2011 China Masters Super Series title when she was leading 21–16 and 8–5 & her opponent Jiang Yanjiao retired. She also claimed Macau Open title in the year end by beating Han Li in the summit clash.

2012 
Wang won the Korean Open title by beating Jiang Yanjiao in the final clash. She was the finalist in the 2012 Swiss Open Grand Prix Gold, where she gone down against Saina Nehwal. She won her first Asian Championship medal when she reached the semifinal. But was defeated by Wang Yihan hence settled for bronze. She was the prime contender from China for the participation in the 2012 Olympics, other already confirmed players from China were Wang Yihan and Wang Xin. But there was another rising Chinese player Li Xuerui who was ranked below Wang Shixian but with her stunning 6 finals in the 1st half of 2012 made her ranking points more than Shixian and hence, the head coach Li Yongbo selected Li instead of Wang Shixian to contest the Olympics, and Shixian's Olympic dream was broken.  However some sources say she had relatively poor performance against other top players of different countries when compared to her teammates, significantly against players like Saina Nehwal & Juliane Schenk. Li Xuerui on the other hand had beaten them multiple times so that's why Shixian was omitted from the Olympic squad and Li was chosen. In year end finals, she reached the semifinal after having 2 group wins. She ousted Ratchanok Intanon there and advanced to final round. She retired when trailing 9–21, 4–15 against Li Xuerui and finished as runner-up.

2013 

After a moment of distress Wang Shixian started the year very well, she was runner-up to the Victor Korea Open where she was ousted by Sung Ji-hyun. She succeeded in taking the Swiss Open title by beating Ratchanok Intanon. Wang Shixian competed at the BWF world championship that took place in Guangzhou China as the 7th seed. Nonetheless she lost against P. V. Sindhu again (18–21; 17–21) who also downed Wang's compatriot & defending champion Wang Yihan earlier in the 2nd round. The Chinese coaches later revealed that they took time to analyze Sindhu's game. In October, Wang Shixian played at the Yonex French Open Superseries as the 7 seed, she managed to climb her way to the final in getting rid of all her opponents in 2 straight games. Wang showed a great performance and overcame a tough challenge by Thailand's Porntip Buranaprasertsuk to win (21–18; 21–18) and grabbed her 1st Superseries title since the Victor Korea Open in 2012. She then lost in the finals of 2013 China Open Super Series Premier & 2013 Hong Kong Super Series to her team-mates Li Xuerui & Wang Yihan respectively. She put up a good show at the 2013 BWF Super Series Finals where she won all her group stage matches against Tai Tzu-ying, Sung Ji-hyun and Porntip Buranaprasertsuk in 2 games. She was favourite to win the semifinal after her repeat clash with Tai again. But this time, she suffered defeat, with very narrow margins in 3 tense games.

2014 
She made her way to the final of the 2014 Malaysia Super Series Premier but lost against her compatriot Li Xuerui. She then afterwards won her 2nd All England title, in which she defeated the trio of Olympic medallists (Nehwal in quarter-final, Yihan in semifinal & Li Xuerui in the final) which made her victory even more memorable. Meanwhile, Chen Long made his way to the final and the English media seized the occasion to talk about the All England as the fulfillment of the love affair of Chen and Shixian. However, both of them confessed in an interview that they didn't know what went on in England and it was embarrassing to mix their professional relationship and private life in order to make the buzz. In the 2014 India Super Series, even though Wang faced tough opponents as she was reckoned as the player who's been on court the longest time that to say almost six hours, she won the title, beating Li Xuerui yet again 22–20, 21-19. In an Interview Shixian said "It's all about beating the others so as long as China wins we're happy" which shows the fair play and the support between players. She also settled for the silver medal in 2014 Badminton Asia Championships where she lost to Sung Ji-hyun who was playing in front of her home crowd.
Wang was second-seeded in the 2014 BWF World Championships and was one of the favourites to win the tournament. But she was again defeated in a thrilling quarter-final match against P. V. Sindhu, a player to whom Wang lost to in the previous year. In September Wang played in the team event of the Asian games. She and her team won the gold medal beating the Korean team 3–0. However, she didn't get selected in the individual event. In October, Wang Shixian retained her French title, her third superseries title of the year, after Li Xuerui retired in the 2nd game, 21–15, 8–5. Wang Shixian qualified in first place for the year end Super Series Finals staged for the first time in Dubai. She lost all three of her round-robin matches in straight sets and exited the tournament.

2015–2016 
2015 proved disappointing year for Wang, as she was stopped in the semifinals of many tournaments. In her quarter-final at the 2015 Malaysia Super Series Premier, she played the longest ever Women's singles badminton match against Nozomi Okuhara, which lasted for 1 hours & 51 minutes. Wang won that encounter and Okuhara was left cramping in that historic match. She did have final appearances at the 2015 Australian Super Series and 2015 French Super Series, both of them being lost to Carolina Marín. She was also a quarterfinalist at the 2015 BWF World Championships, where she lost to Marín again. In the 2014 BWF Super Series Finals, she won only one match (against Sung Ji-hyun) & lost other 2 group matches which denied her advancement in the semifinals.

In 2016, she paddled off the year with the runner-up finish at the 2016 German Open Grand Prix Gold where she lost to Li Xuerui. In her overall 3rd final at the All England Open, Wang was beaten by Nozomi Okuhara in a controversial 3-gamer, in which she lost a close 11–21, 21–16, 19–21 match. In the 2016 Chinese Taipei Open Grand Prix Gold, she made her way to the final before losing to local star Tai Tzu-ying in the final. Just like the last Olympics, Shixian again failed to participate in the 2016 Olympics, as Chinese team selected higher ranked Wang Yihan as a 2nd qualifier from China, another already confirmed player was the defending Olympic champion Li Xuerui. She subsequently decided to take retirement from the professional badminton.

Personal life 

Wang graduated from the Nanjing University of Finance and Economics with a bachelor's degree. After retirement she finished a master's degree in sports education at the Beijing Sports University where she has taught since 2020.

She married former teammate Chen Long in 2017, after over a decade together. She gave birth to a son in June 2019.

As a child she attended a sports school in Jiangsu province. The boy who sat next to her during classes was table tennis player Xu Xin.

Achievements

BWF World Championships 
Women's singles

Asian Games 
Women's singles

Asian Championships 
Women's singles

East Asian Games 
Women's singles

BWF World Junior Championships 
Girls' singles

BWF Superseries (12 titles, 11 runners-up) 
The BWF Superseries, launched on 14 December 2006 and implemented in 2007, is a series of elite badminton tournaments, sanctioned by Badminton World Federation (BWF). BWF Superseries has two level such as Superseries and Superseries Premier. A season of Superseries features twelve tournaments around the world, which introduced since 2011, with successful players invited to the Superseries Finals held at the year end.

Women's singles

  BWF Superseries Finals tournament
  BWF Superseries Premier tournament
  BWF Superseries tournament

BWF Grand Prix (3 titles, 3runners-up) 
The BWF Grand Prix had two levels, the BWF Grand Prix and Grand Prix Gold. It was a series of badminton tournaments sanctioned by the Badminton World Federation (BWF) which was held from 2007 to 2017.

Women's singles

  BWF Grand Prix Gold tournament
  BWF Grand Prix tournament

Performance timeline

Singles performance timeline 

To avoid confusion and double counting, information in this table is updated only once a tournament or the player's participation in the tournament has concluded. This table is current through 2016 All England Super Series Premier.

Record against selected opponents 
Record against year-end Finals finalists, World Championships semi-finalists, and Olympic quarter-finalists.

References

External links 

  Profile
 

1990 births
Living people
Sportspeople from Suzhou
Badminton players from Jiangsu
Chinese female badminton players
Badminton players at the 2010 Asian Games
Badminton players at the 2014 Asian Games
Asian Games gold medalists for China
Asian Games medalists in badminton
Medalists at the 2010 Asian Games
Medalists at the 2014 Asian Games
World No. 1 badminton players
20th-century Chinese women
21st-century Chinese women